Pulsed Pressure Cavitation Technique (PPCT) is a method to simulate cavitation damage using repetitive pressure pulses. It is developed at Oak Ridge National Laboratory.

The major components of PPCT include a repetitive pulse source and a testing chamber. For examples, a pulsed laser source can be used to generate large shock waves in a confined space. The shock waves then can induce cavitating bubbles.

References 

Oak Ridge National Laboratory
Simulation
Fluid dynamics